Manchester Airport  is an international airport in Ringway, Manchester, England,  south-west of Manchester city centre. In 2019, it was the third busiest airport in the United Kingdom in terms of passenger numbers and the busiest of those not serving London.

Officially opened on 25 June 1938, it was initially known as Ringway Airport, a name still in local use. In World War II, as RAF Ringway, it was a base for the Royal Air Force. The airport is owned and managed by the Manchester Airport Holdings (trading as MAG), a holding company owned by the Australian finance house IFM Investors and the ten metropolitan borough councils of Greater Manchester, with Manchester City Council owning the largest stake. Ringway, after which the airport was named, is a village with a few buildings and a church at the western edge of the airport.

Future developments include the £800 million Airport City Manchester logistics, manufacturing, office and hotel space next to the airport. Ongoing and future transport improvements include the £290 million Eastern Link relief road, which opened in October 2018. A High Speed 2 station known as Manchester Airport High Speed station, earmarked for opening in 2033, will create a regular sub-ten-minute shuttle service for connecting rail passengers between central Manchester and the Airport while relieving stress on the Styal Line to the Airport from Manchester which has become one of the most congested routes on the National Rail network.

After the airport handled a record 27.8 million passengers in 2017, it underwent major expansion to double the size of Terminal 2, the first elements opening in 2019. The £1 billion expansion will be completed in 2024 and enable Terminal 2 to handle 35 million passengers. Capacity exists for up to 50 million passengers annually with two runways; however, this potential figure is limited by the airport's restriction to 61 aircraft movements per hour as well as existing terminal sizes to process arrivals and departures effectively.

History

Construction commenced in Ringway parish on 28 November 1935 and the airport was partially operational by June 1937, with full construction completed on 25 June 1938. Its northern border was Yewtree Lane between Firtree Farm and The Grange, east of the crossroads marked "Ringway", and its southeast border a little west of Altrincham Road, along the lane from Oversleyford running northeast then east into Styal.  In 1938, KLM became the first airline to launch scheduled commercial flights to Manchester.

During World War II, RAF Ringway was important in military aircraft production and training parachutists. After the War, the base reverted to a civilian airport and gradually expanded to its present size. Manchester was Britain's second-busiest airport, after Heathrow, by the 1960s.

In 1946, Air France began operations from Manchester following the commencement of peacetime passenger services form the airport, and remains the airport's longest continuous operator, celebrating 75 years of service in 2021. In 1953, Manchester began 24-hour operation, with the ability to handle flights during the day and night, which helped the airport handle 163,000 passengers. 1953 also saw the start of intercontinental flights by Sabena Belgian to New York, followed closely by the launch of services to New York by BOAC.

The first transatlantic flights to originate at Manchester begain in 1963. The thrice-weekly service was operated by BOAC using a Boeing 707 via Prestwick.

In 1971, the airport reached a milestone of handling over 2 million passengers in one year. The following year saw the opening of a link road connecting the airport to the M56 Motorway, improving road access from Manchester, Cheshire and North Wales. In 1975, Ringway was officially renamed Manchester International Airport.

The airport saw rapid growth and expansion during the 1980s and 1990s, shaping the airport for the coming decades. Many of the developments made during this period remain in place or have only recently been altered following the introduction of the Manchester Transformation Project. Passenger numbers continued to grow, reaching the milestone of handing one million passengers a month for the first time in 1987. This growth boosted expansion plans, including planning for a new terminal. The following year, in 1988 Manchester celebrated its Golden jubilee.

Terminal A, which now forms part of Terminal 3, was opened by Diana, Princess of Wales in 1989. In 1993, Terminal 2 was officially opened by the Duke of Edinburgh along with the official opening of Manchester Airport station. From 1997 to 2001, a second runway was constructed, causing large-scale protests in Cheshire, especially in the village of Styal where natural habitats were disturbed and listed buildings demolished to make space for construction.

During the early 2000s, British Airways scaled down operations from Manchester Airport with the sale of their BA Connect subsidiary to Flybe and the ending of their franchise agreement with GB Airways, a business subsequently sold to EasyJet. In October 2008, the daily New York–JFK service was terminated and in March 2013 the daily to London Gatwick was ended, although the service has resumed in recent years.

Since taking over BA Connect's select routes, Flybe has gone on to add several more destinations. In 2012, Flybe introduced the "mini hub" concept co-ordinating the arrival and departure times of various domestic services throughout the day and thereby creating combinations such as Norwich–Manchester–Belfast, Glasgow–Manchester–Southampton and Edinburgh–Manchester–Exeter with conveniently short transfer times.

The Airbus A380 arrived in 2010, operated by Emirates, which continues to operate the aircraft up to three times daily on its route to Dubai

Manchester Airport celebrated its 75th anniversary in 2013. That year also saw the completion and opening of the newly constructed air traffic control tower – which is now located in an independent tower, not on top of the airport as previously – and Airport City Manchester gained planning approval. During 2013, Virgin Atlantic introduced its Little Red short-haul brand to take-up some of the available Heathrow and Gatwick slots, which resulted from BMI ceasing operations. Manchester was the inaugural destination, with services were operated by aircraft leased from Aer Lingus. However, these services ceased in March 2015 because of low sales.

In 2014, the Manchester Airport Metrolink route launched as part of the route expansion plans of the Manchester Metrolink tramway, aiding transport to and from the airport to the city centre.

In 2019, the first phase of the new Terminal 2 extension was completed, and Pier 1 opened on 1 April 2019. The second phase of the extension plan opened on 14 July 2021.

During the later part of the decade, Monarch Airlines, Thomas Cook Airlines and Flybe all entered administration and ceased operations, having a major impact on local employment and operations at Manchester, as well as leaving thousands of passengers stranded, many abroad. Monarch was an operator at Manchester between 1981 and 2017, operating short and medium flights to Europe, and had its own maintenance base at the airport. It entered administration and ceased operations in 2017. Thomas Cook Airlines was a major operator at Manchester, operating scheduled and charter flights to over 50 destinations in Europe, America and the Caribbean. Its parent company also had a maintenance base at the airport. The airline entered compulsory liquidation in September 2019, with many aircraft left parked at the airport while payment disputes were concluded. Flybe was a British airline with a significant base at Manchester, which provided more than half of UK domestic flights outside London. Plans were formulated by a consortium Including Stobart Air and Virgin Atlantic to save FlyBe with the launch of Connect Airways, but plans were dropped in early 2020 and all operations ceased.

Like most British and International airports, Manchester has been severely affected by the global Coronavirus pandemic and the subsequent reduction in air passengers. A number of airlines ceased, paused or reduced routes to the airport. The reduced passenger numbers saw the temporary closure of both Terminals 2 and 3. In late 2020 American Airlines announced that its daily flights to Philadelphia would cease operation amid ongoing travel disruption caused by the Coronavirus outbreak. The departure of American Airlines also marked the final US-based airline at Manchester. American Airlines had previously operated services to New York, Chicago, Dallas, Miami, Boston, and Charlotte. Data recorded and published by the Civil Aviation Authority (CAA) show that during the first 11 months (January through November) of 2020, passenger 'Terminal & Transit' numbers dropped from 29,374,282 in 2019 to 6,787,127 in 2020.

Future

As part of the Government's Future of Air Transport White Paper, Manchester Airport published its Master Plan on its proposed expansions until 2030. Demolition of older buildings, such as old storage buildings, the old Alpha Catering Building and Males Garage, to the east of Terminal 2 has already begun, to make way for a new apron and taxiway towards runway 05L/23R and an eastwards extension of Terminal 2, which is planned to provide fifteen more covered stands.

The World Logistics Hub is also part of the Airport City Enterprise Developments in south Manchester. This development is designed to meet the growing demand for cargo handling space and infrastructure outside of the southeast. Positioned on the southwest side of the A538 road, next to the southeast side of the M56 motorway across the A538 from the World Freight Terminal, it provides access to the trunk motorway network via Junction 6.

Manchester Airport has development plans to meet the growing demand to fly. One document, "The Need for Land", outlines several development ideas. Five affected areas are:
 Area A is a triangle of land between the A538 road and Runway 1 and the cargo terminal which is currently under development. It will be used together with Area E, a triangle of land west of the A538 up to the M56, with its west corner opposite Warburton Green, for the expansion of aircraft maintenance, vehicle maintenance/storage and cargo handling. The Clough Bank and Cotterill Clough areas are being enhanced with mitigation areas that will become part of the extensive Landscape Habitat Management Area. The A538 alignment to be retained and capacity has been added, as required, to meet increased traffic volumes.
 Area B is north of Ringway Road and east of Shadow Moss Road, and a car park has been provided to replace spaces lost to the Airport City development and apron/terminal expansion.
 Area C consists of several areas of land mainly inside the M56/M56 spur junction, around Hasty Lane east of M56 and around the current M56 spur. The land will be used for hotels and office space. Terminal 1's current capacity is around 11 million passengers a year, compared with an annual capacity of 2.5 million passengers when it first opened.

In the summer of 2009, a £50 million redevelopment programme for Terminal 1 was completed, as well as the construction of new car parking facilities and taxiways for aircraft.
 Area D consists of areas of land on both sides of Manchester Airport railway spur, at Smithy Farm and east of B5166 Styal Road around and inside railway spur junction where car parking, offices, hotels, etc. can be developed.

Passenger terminals

Manchester Airport has three passenger terminals (Terminals 1, 2 and 3). Terminals 1 and 2 are linked by the skylink, with travelators to aid passengers with the 10–15-minute walk. Terminal 3 is linked to Terminal 1 and the skylink by a covered walkway. The "skylink" also connects the terminals to the airport railway station complex (known as "The Station") and the Radisson BLU Hotel. Skylink 1 started construction in 1991 and opened 1993. Skylink 2 opened in September 1996 along with the Radisson.

Terminal 1
Terminal 1 is used by airlines with scheduled and charter operations, flying to European and other worldwide destinations. It is the second largest terminal at the airport. It was opened in 1962, by Prince Philip, Duke of Edinburgh, and it is a base for easyJet.

The terminal has 2 piers which combined have 29 stands, of which 15 have air bridges. Gate 12 was specially adapted to accommodate the Airbus A380, which is operated by Emirates on their route three times per day from Dubai to Manchester. Terminal 1's current capacity is around 11 million passengers a year, compared with an annual capacity of 2.5 million passengers when it first opened.

In the Summer of 2009, a £50 million redevelopment programme for Terminal 1 was completed, which included a new £14 million 14-lane security area. Passenger flow on Terminal 1's gating piers is due to be realigned, with plans to redesign the piers so departures and arrivals do not contraflow on the same level, allowing larger seating areas at the gates, express retail outlets and a dedicated lounge and gating area for future Airbus A380 flights. Currently only Gate 12, Pier B, has been upgraded to accommodate the A380. Part of this work saw the removal of the South Bay remote aircraft stands, constructed in 1962 between taxiways Juliet and Kilo and more recently re-aligning taxiway Juliet into an extended taxiway Bravo.

Terminal 1 is not planned to be included in the 10 Year Airport expansion project, and will shut in 2025 when the new Terminal 2 is completed  In 2025, Airlines operating from Terminal 1 will move across to the new Terminal 2, and Terminal 1 will be 'Mothballed'. 

Airlines operating from Terminal 1 include Aer Lingus, Air Transat, Emirates, EasyJet, Gulf Air, Icelandair, Lufthansa, Scandinavian Airlines, Swiss International Air Lines, TAP Air Portugal, and Turkish Airlines.

Terminal 2
Terminal 2 is used by a variety of airlines, operating both charter and scheduled flights to many European and worldwide destinations.

The design of the terminal makes it capable of extensive expansion; building work has begun for an extension providing additional gates, together with the construction of a satellite pier. Terminal 2's current capacity is around 8 million passengers a year; this will be extended to ultimately handle 25 million passengers a year. In 2007, an £11 million project commenced to redevelop Terminal 2 by improving security facilities and enhancing retail and catering services.

Terminal 2 has recently received a major extension, completed in 2021, to encompass formerly remote stands to the west. Between twelve and fifteen covered aircraft stands have been made available by this. An air side link for transferring passengers between Terminals 1 and 2 is at the planning stage, designed in an effort to boost Manchester's chances of becoming a major hub airport and minimise missed connections. It was announced in June 2015 that the airport would have an expansion taking 10 years to complete. Terminal 2 is now the most developed terminal, with new piers and also a larger security hall as well as more outlets.

The first phase of the new extension, Pier 1, opened on 1 April 2019.
 The second phase, the terminal extension, was due to open in April 2020 but was delayed due to the impacts of the COVID-19 pandemic, finally opening on 14 July 2021. The third phase which was announced on 25 January 2023 includes the refurbishment of the existing Terminal 2 featuring a brand new security hall, and also includes the construction of Pier 2. Work is due to be complete in 2025.

Airlines operating from Terminal 2 include Aegean Airlines, Aer Lingus UK, Air Canada, Air France, Brussels Airlines, Cathay Pacific, Ethiopian Airlines, Etihad Airways, Eurowings, Hainan Airlines, Jet2.com, KLM, Kuwait Airways, Norwegian Air Shuttle, Pegasus Airlines, Qatar Airways, Saudia, Singapore Airlines, TUI Airways and Virgin Atlantic.

Terminal 3
Terminal A, as it was then known, was opened in 1989 by Diana, Princess of Wales as a self contained new domestic terminal to replace the original pier A. It had many names before its expansion and re-designation as Terminal 3 in May 1998.
The terminal was known in succession as "Terminal A"; "Terminal A – Domestic"; "Terminal 1A" after Terminal 2 opened in 1993; "Terminal 1A – British Airways and Domestic"; "Terminal 3 – British Airways and Domestic" before becoming simply known as Terminal 3 in 1998. In June 1998, British Airways opened their new £75 million terminal facility designed by Grimshaw Architects, this being a major extension to Terminal A and became the primary user of the terminal along with codeshare partner airlines (Oneworld). Flights from terminal 3 are operated by Aurigny, British Airways, Eastern Airways, Iberia Express, Loganair, Ryanair and Vueling.

PremiAir VIP terminal
Work began on the PremiAir VIP terminal (adjacent to the Runway visitor park) in 2019 and it opened on 21 October 2019. Passengers are shuttled to their flight by limousine included within the service. Luggage and lounge access is an additional service offered. PremiAir is currently closed to the public "until further notice".

Airlines and destinations
The following airlines operate regular scheduled flights to and from Manchester:

Statistics

Annual statistics

Busiest routes

Operations

Maintenance bases
Manchester Airport is the home to the engineering base of Jet2.com and, up until 23 September 2019, it was also the engineering base of the Thomas Cook Group Airlines. Airlines such as Etihad Airways also have one of six maintenance bases worldwide in Manchester with their newly opened (2011) line maintenance facility.

World Freight Terminal

Manchester Airport has a World Freight Terminal, serving cargo-only freighter services and cargo carried on regular passenger flights. It was opened in 1986, west of the original airfield. There are three aircraft maintenance hangars, with five transit sheds, operated by British Airways World Cargo, Swissport Cargo, Menzies World Cargo, and dnata UK. There are over 100 freight forwarding companies on site.

Freight throughput at the airport grew from 94,000 tonnes in 1997 to the peak at 165,000 tonnes in 2007, but then declined to around 93,000 tonnes in 2013, subsequently increasing to over 109,000 tonnes in 2016 making Manchester the fourth-busiest UK airport for freight behind London Heathrow, East Midlands, and London Stansted airports.

Runways

Manchester Airport has two parallel runways. Runway 1 (23R/05L)  and Runway 2 (23L/05R) .

The original main runway, then designated 06/24 and initially  in length, opened on 17 May 1937 when the airport was used as an RAF base and a military aircraft assembly centre. It was extended in stages from 1952, reaching its current length in 1981 to attract long-haul international traffic. As demand and aircraft movements both increased during the mid-1990s, mainly due to the newly completed Terminal 2, the airport studied the option of a second full-length runway. A consultation process began and planning permission was approved in 1997, with construction work starting the same year.

The second runway, initially designated 06R/24L, became operational on 5 February 2001 at a cost of £172 million, and was the first full-length commercial runway to open in Britain for over 20 years. The site where the second runway was constructed was on the southern airfield boundary, which is near the village of Styal in the Cheshire countryside. The project was deemed controversial because of the destruction of natural wildlife habitats and because of changes to flight paths to enable aircraft to fly in and out of the second runway. Aircraft landing from the southwest on to Runway 2 (05R) fly lower over the residential area of Knutsford. As aircraft rarely land on to Runway 2 from the northeast (Runway 23L) or takeoff from Runway 2 to the northeast (Runway 05R) there has been no change to the path of aircraft over Heald Green, Cheadle and Stockport.

Planning permission for Runway 2 (23L/05R) permits use of both runways between the hours of 0600–2200. At night between the hours of 2200–0600 single runway operations based on Runway 1 (23R/05L) are used. Exceptions are made for emergencies and planned maintenance. In practice, dual runway operations incorporating Runway 2 (23L/05R) are only used at peak demand, which is currently in the morning and then again between 1300-2000hrs.

Most aircraft arriving into Manchester Airport use the instrument landing system, which in line with most other airports has a glide slope of 3 degrees equal to descending 318 feet per nautical mile. The prevailing wind direction is westerly, so normally aircraft fly from northeast to southwest. In practice this means that normally aircraft land from the northeast over Stockport, Cheadle, and Heald Green, and takeoff towards Knutsford. In dual runway operations aircraft will usually land on to Runway 1 (23R) and depart from Runway 2 (23L). When the wind direction changes, usually affecting 20% of movements per annum, operations are reversed with aircraft landing from the southwest, lining up to the south over Northwich and over Knutsford and taking off towards Stockport. In dual runway operations aircraft will usually land on to Runway 2 (05R) and depart from Runway 1 (05L). Sometimes, aircraft arriving into Manchester Airport are held in stacks, usually in poor weather when the movement rate decreases. The airport has 3 stacks: DAYNE, MIRSI and ROSUN, each located approximately 15/20 miles from the airport. DAYNE serves arrivals from the south, ROSUN from the north and east and MIRSI from the west. Residents living within 20 miles of the airport will likely see and hear aircraft.

Control tower
A new control tower was opened on 25 June 2013. At 60 m tall, it is the UK's second tallest control tower, after London Heathrow and it replaces the old tower on top of Terminal 1.

Security
Manchester Airport is policed by the Greater Manchester Police and Manchester Airport Fire Service. Several security-related incidents have occurred at the airport in recent years.
 In 2002, a security firm successfully smuggled fake explosives, detonators and genuine firearms onto a flight.
 In 2004, the BBC's Whistleblower programme revealed security failures at the airport, including faulty metal detectors and a lack of regular random baggage checks. Many of the claims made on the programme were later discredited and much of the camera work was found to be misleading (filming from a raised footpath was used to suggest there was no security fence on the southern perimeter of the site).
 In 2005, police used a taser on a man spotted acting suspiciously on the apron, after he appeared to resist arrest.
 On 6 June 2006, Aabid Hussain Khan, 21, of West Yorkshire and a 16-year-old boy were arrested at the airport and later charged under Section 57 of the Terrorism Act, for conspiracy to murder and conspiracy to cause public nuisance by using poisons or explosives.
 On 24 July 2012, an 11-year-old boy went straight through security and managed to board the nearest boarding flight from security in T1, which was a Jet2 flight to Rome. Halfway through the flight one passenger reported him to the cabin crew, who then detained the boy at Rome and put him on the next flight back to Manchester.
 On 5 August 2014, a 47-year-old man was arrested after the pilot of a plane became aware of a potential explosive device on board. This turned out to be a hoax. As a result, Manchester Airport airfield operations were suspended for around 30 minutes whilst the man was led away by armed police. The incident required an escort from an RAF Typhoon jet into Manchester.
 In April 2015, the passengers arriving from Madrid on a Ryanair flight entered the UK without having their passports checked. A spokesman for the airport said it was the responsibility of the airline's handling agent to notify the UK Border Force about flights from outside the UK.
 In November 2017, the passengers arriving on an EasyJet flight from Paris were mistakenly directed to departures rather than arrivals. The situation was caused by a door that was opened by a staff member, which led to the cross-contamination of arriving and departing passengers. The security breach resulted in confusion and delays, with a spokesman for the Department of Transport stating that it is the responsibility of airlines and airport operators to ensure passengers arriving in the UK are directed through the correct route.

Ground transport

Rail

Manchester Airport station, opened in May 1993, is between Terminals 1 and 2. It is linked to the terminals by a Skylink moving walkway. Trains operated by Northern, TransPennine Express and Transport for Wales connect the airport to Manchester Piccadilly and other railway stations, mainly throughout northern England, including Crewe, Wigan, Blackpool North railway station, as well as Edinburgh and Glasgow in Scotland and Holyhead and Llandudno in Wales. A third platform was completed in 2008 to allow for an increase in rail capacity. In 2009, Network Rail stated that the third platform meant that capacity will become constrained by the layover of the trains and recommended building a line underneath the Airport towards Northwich by 2024. In January 2013, the Government announced that a new railway station, Manchester Airport High Speed station on the north side of the M56 will be included in Phase 2 of High Speed 2 which will provide links with other British cities like Birmingham and London and also a quicker route into Central Manchester. Work on building a new fourth platform at the existing railway station commenced in early 2014 with a blockade required in February 2015 to allow completion. Construction finished in May 2015 and the platform opened to passengers in autumn 2015.

Metrolink

A Metrolink service from Cornbrook station to the Airport opened in November 2014 and runs at 12-minute frequency. Journeys along the 15-stop line from Cornbrook take approximately 35 minutes. The Manchester Metrolink light rail system has had plans to extend to the airport for many years. When the idea of a congestion charge was mooted, part of the scheme was to have extended the Metrolink to the airport. However, when this was rejected, the future of the scheme was in doubt. In 2009, it was announced that the line to the airport would finally be built. The airport line is one spur of the line from St Werburgh's Road to East Didsbury and Manchester Airport, which opened on 3 November 2014 – 18 months ahead of schedule. As of November 2022, Metrolink services from the Airport operate to Manchester Victoria via Market Street.

Bus and coach
The Station is the airport's ground transport interchange and brings bus, coach and rail passengers under one roof. Over 300 trains, 100 coaches and 500 buses a day use the facility, including the 24-hour bus service 43, which runs every 10 minutes (every 30 minutes at night) to Manchester city centre via Wythenshawe, Northenden, Withington, Fallowfield and Rusholme. There is also Skyline service 199 operating every 30 minutes to Buxton via Stockport, Disley and Chapel-en-le-Frith, as well as a number of Stagecoach Manchester and Arriva North West services to Stockport, Altrincham and various parts of South Manchester. A network of National Express and Megabus coach services serve Manchester Airport and operate to destinations further afield.

Road
The airport is a 20-minute drive from Manchester city centre and is reached by the M56 motorway, with a dedicated approach road from the motorway at junction 5. The M56 is the main route used by traffic to reach the airport. There are also minor local roads serving the airport from the north (Wythenshawe) and the east (Heald Green). The M56/A538 road junction serves the World Freight Terminal, to the west of the airport. The A538 runs east–west serving the local towns of Altrincham and Wilmslow.

Proposed as part of the SEMMMS (South East Manchester Multi-Modal Strategy) Relief Road Scheme, a new link road to the A6 south of Stockport opened in 2018. Planning permission had been granted, with inquiries for Compulsory Purchase and Side Roads Orders following up in September 2014. After significant delays, the link road opened on 15 October 2018.

Taxi ranks are situated by arrivals at all three terminals.

Parking
The airport's official short-stay car parking can be found in the multistorey car parks adjacent to Terminals 1, 2 and 3. In July 2007, the airport introduced a 'No Waiting' restriction on all access roads surrounding the terminals. As of June 2018, the public are required to pay charges of £3 for five minutes on the terminal forecourt or £4 for the maximum ten minutes in order to drop off passengers. The charges have been highly controversial: local taxi drivers have described them as a "cash cow" for the airport, and were described by a judge for Minshull Street Crown Court as "extraordinary" and "an absolute disgrace" after he gave a psychology teacher a suspended sentence for deliberately driving into a parking official in an act of road rage over the charges.

In 2009/2010, Terminal 1's multi-storey car park was refurbished. Each level of the car park is colour-coded. The floor, walls, ceiling and supports have all received a repaint with every parking space having a sensor and green light above it, with empty parking bays indicated by the green light.

Official long-stay on-airport parking from Manchester Airport is located near the terminals and served by a regular courtesy bus. There is one long-stay car park serving Terminals 1 and 3 and a separate dedicated long-stay car park for Terminal 2. In 2009, the airport opened JetParks – two long-stay car parks less than a mile from the terminals. This is a cheaper alternative to the on-site car parks and is served by a 24-hour shuttle bus every 15 minutes. The airport also operates a Shuttle Park for long-stay car parking, which is also served by a regular courtesy bus and is located just off the airport site to the east of Terminal 3.
The airport has since augmented these products with a 3rd JetParks car park, JetParks 3. This is located adjacent to Shuttle Parks and, as a result, Shuttle Parks was renamed JetParks Plus.
Manchester Airport also operates a very large scale valet parking product across all 3 terminals that it has branded as "Meet & Greet".

In 2014, a new 9,000 space car park located underneath the approach to 23R was constructed, the first area of the site opened in the autumn. The remainder of the facility will open in time for summer 2015.

There are several privately operated car parks within a short distance of the airport, served by shuttle bus, as well as several off-site companies operating valet parking services.

Drop off zones
Up until 2018, cars dropping off passengers could do so outside terminals for free.  On 10 July 2018, Manchester Airport took the step of introducing a fee of £3 to £4 for vehicles dropping off passengers at terminals. Alternatively, passengers being dropped off can be taken to an off-site car park from where a shuttle bus operates to the terminals. The airport issues fines of up to £100 to vehicles which breach its terms and conditions for the drop off zones. The changes have been seen as unwelcome and nonconstructive by passengers and taxi drivers, with some saying they will boycott the airport. The change has also attracted criticism from local Councillors in Cheshire, who point out that many places directly under Manchester Airport's flight paths do not have a direct public transport link to the airport. While some other UK airports also have drop off charges, Manchester Airport's charges are overall higher than those at any other airport.

Effect on the area

Between 1997 and 1999 three protest camps were set up to oppose the building of the second runway, the felling of nearby trees on land owned by the National Trust in Styal, Cheshire and air transportation in general. Camps were set up in Flywood, Arthur's Wood and Cedar's Wood. Swampy, a well known activist, was among many protesters.

The south west end of the new runway is closer to the town of Knutsford and to the village of Mobberley. There was initially an increase in noise experienced by local residents from the aircraft being lower and closer. All residents that were able to prove that their property had lost value, as a result of the operation of Runway 2, were compensated in 2010.
In 2012 Manchester Airports Group made a further, voluntary payment, to compensate those who felt aggrieved but had been unable to prove financial harm as a result of the operation of Runway 2. The precepts for Knutsford Town Council and Mobberley Parish Council residents were paid and money invested in local schools.

In 2007 Manchester Airport applied to build on land in Styal to increase its car parking. However, the former Macclesfield Borough Council refused to give them planning permission to do so and expressed annoyance at the airport for not investing enough in public transport.

Accidents and incidents
 On 27 March 1951, a Douglas C-47A-75-DL Dakota 3 cargo aircraft operated by Air Transport Charter and en route to Nutts Corner, Antrim, Northern Ireland, crashed at Heyhead shortly after take-off from runway 06, following the aircraft's failure to gain height. There were four fatalities – two of the three crew on board and two of the three passengers. The subsequent investigation found that the crash resulted from a loss of engine power, caused by ice forming in the carburettor intakes, attributable to the captain's failure to use the heat controls. An extended undercarriage and snow on the wings may have also been contributory factors.
 On 14 March 1957, British European Airways Flight 411 operated by Vickers Viscount 701 (registration G-ALWE) inbound from Amsterdam crashed into houses in Shadow Moss Road, Woodhouse Park. The aircraft was on final approach to Runway 24 at Manchester Airport and the crash was due to a flap failure, caused by fatigue of a wing bolt. All 20 occupants on board died, as did two on the ground.
 On 29 April 1957, a Miles Aerovan Type 4 crashed on takeoff due to fuel pump failure. 2 on board were killed, including the pilot.
 On 4 June 1967, a British Midland International Canadair C-4 Argonaut (registration G-ALHG) was inbound from Palma and crashed near the centre of Stockport after loss of engine power due to fuel problems and an aborted approach to Manchester Airport, with 72 fatalities.
 On 20 March 1969, Vickers Viscount G-AVJA of British Midland International crashed on take-off. Three of the four people on board were killed.
 On 22 August 1985, an engine of a Boeing 737–236 Advanced, operated by British Airtours, failed during take-off from runway 24, the fire spreading into the cabin, resulting in 55 fatalities (mostly from smoke inhalation) aboard the Boeing 737–236 Advanced G-BGJL. The uncontained engine failure was later traced to an incorrectly repaired combustor causing the turbine disc to shatter and puncture the wing fuel tanks. As a result, fire resistance and evacuation procedures were improved.

Runway Visitor Park

Manchester Airport has had public viewing areas since the airport opened to the public in 1938. The 1960/1970s pier-top viewing facilities have been closed because of security concerns. In May 1992, an official "Aviation Viewing Park" (AVP) was created just off the A538 road on the south-western side of the airfield. This was moved to the western side of the airfield in May 1997 to allow construction of the second runway. Renamed the "Runway Visitor Park" in June 2010, the facility is regarded as providing the best official viewing facilities for aircraft spotting at any major UK airport by aircraft enthusiasts. Visitors can view aircraft taking off and landing from both runways and aircraft taxiing to and from the runways. This attraction now draws around 300,000 visitors a year and is one of Greater Manchester's top 10 attractions.

The Runway Visitor Park is also home to a small number of retired aircraft exhibits. These currently are:

• Avro RJX100 Prototype (Registration: G-IRJX). This was the last British-built jetliner. It was delivered in 2001 from the nearby, but now-demolished Woodford Aerodrome. It was the first exhibit to be added to the park.

• British Airways Concorde (Registration: G-BOAC ‘Alpha Charlie’). Was acquired shortly after the retirement of the British Airways Concorde fleet in 2003. It has since been enclosed in a purpose-built hangar with a conference centre hosting regular events. This particular aircraft was the flagship of the British Airways fleet due to its G-BOAC designation, a reference to BOAC - a forerunner airline to British Airways.

• Front Fuselage of Monarch Airlines DC-10-30 (Registration: G-DMCA). This was the only DC-10 operated by now-defunct Monarch Airlines, operating between 1996-2001. The original complete airframe was held at Manchester for a short while after being retired and subsequently scrapped, the front section being moved to the park in 2003. It is the only remains of a DC-10 in the UK.

• BEA Trident 3 (Registration: G-AWZK). This aircraft last flew in 1985 and had been used for tug and de-ice training at Heathrow Airport. It was moved to the park in 2004, and opened to visitors in 2007. It is both the oldest and longest retired of all the exhibits.

• RAF Nimrod MR2 (Registration: XV231). First deployed in the 1970s and retired in the late 2000s. This aircraft was used in specialist search and rescue missions. It had been used In The Falklands War as well as in Iraq and Afghanistan. It was flown into Manchester and out in display in 2010. It is the only military exhibit.

Notes

References

Bibliography

External links

 

 
Airports established in 1938
Manchester Airports Group
Bus stations in Greater Manchester
Airports in Greater Manchester
1938 establishments in England